Tammy P. Cleland-McGregor (born October 26, 1975) is an American competitor in synchronized swimming and Olympic champion. She was born in Sanford, Florida.

She participated on the American team that received a gold medal in synchronized team at the 1996 Summer Olympics in Atlanta.

References

1975 births
Living people
American synchronized swimmers
Synchronized swimmers at the 1996 Summer Olympics
Olympic gold medalists for the United States in synchronized swimming
Olympic medalists in synchronized swimming
Sportspeople from Sanford, Florida
Medalists at the 1996 Summer Olympics
World Aquatics Championships medalists in synchronised swimming